Ashleigh Monique Murray (born January 18, 1988) is an American actress and singer. She portrayed Josie McCoy, the lead singer of the band Josie and the Pussycats, on the CW television series Riverdale. Murray reprised this role in the Riverdale spin-off series Katy Keene, which premiered on The CW in 2020.

Career
In 2016, Murray was cast as a series regular in The CW's teen drama Riverdale, portraying Josie McCoy, "a gorgeous, snooty and ambitious girl who is the lead singer for the popular band Josie and the Pussycats". The show premiered in 2017, and Murray was a cast member until 2019. In February 2019, it was announced that Murray would reprise her role as Josie McCoy as part of the main cast of the Riverdale spin-off pilot, Katy Keene. In May 2019, The CW ordered Katy Keene to series.

Murray starred, and played the title role, in the Netflix movie Deidra & Laney Rob a Train in 2017. The film had its world premiere at the Sundance Film Festival on January 23, 2017. It was released on March 17, 2017, by Netflix.

In 2017, it was announced that Murray had joined the cast of MGM's musical Valley Girl, a remake of the 1983 film, as Loryn.

Filmography

Film

Television

References

External links

1988 births
Living people
American television actresses
African-American actresses
21st-century American actresses
American film actresses
Actresses from Kansas City, Missouri
21st-century African-American women
21st-century African-American people
20th-century African-American people
20th-century African-American women